Civil War Fortification at Barnesville, also known as Fort Barnesville, is a historic American Civil War fortification located at Deer Run State Forest near Ellington, Reynolds County, Missouri.  It was built in 1863, and consists of a horseshoe shaped redoubt.  It measures approximately 150 feet long and 135 feet wide.

It was listed on the National Register of Historic Places in 1998.

References

American Civil War on the National Register of Historic Places
Forts on the National Register of Historic Places in Missouri
Military installations established in 1863
Buildings and structures in Reynolds County, Missouri
National Register of Historic Places in Reynolds County, Missouri